Alco is an unincorporated community in Vernon Parish, Louisiana, United States.

Etymology
Alco was named after the Alexandria Lumber Company.

References

Unincorporated communities in Vernon Parish, Louisiana
Unincorporated communities in Louisiana